(meaning "The Planning Board"; ABP) is an independent, statutory, quasi-judicial body that decides on appeals from planning decisions made by local authorities in the Republic of Ireland. As of 2007, An Bord Pleanála directly decided major strategic infrastructural projects under the provisions of the Planning and Development (Strategic Infrastructure) Act 2006. The Board also hears applications from local authorities for projects which would have a significant environmental impact.

History 
The Board was established by the Local Government (Planning and Development) Act 1976, assuming responsibility for planning appeals in March 1977. Its provisions have for the most part been carried over into the Planning and Development Act 2000.

Controversy 

In April 2022 online news platform The Ditch reported that the body's deputy chairperson Paul Hyde had failed to declare his property interests to the board. Hyde resigned from his position in July 2022 before an investigation into the allegations by Remy Farrell SC was concluded. In October 2022 it was reported that the DPP had decided to initiate a criminal prosecution against Hyde. The following month, the body's chairman Dave Walsh announced he was taking early retirement amid ongoing controversy at the board.

References

External links
An Bord Pleanála website
Functions of the Board, An Bord Pleanála

Government agencies of the Republic of Ireland
Architecture in the Republic of Ireland
Department of Housing, Local Government and Heritage